AEgIS (Antimatter Experiment: gravity, Interferometry, Spectroscopy), AD-6, is an experiment at the Antiproton Decelerator facility at CERN. Its primary goal is to measure directly the effect of Earth's gravitational field on antihydrogen atoms with significant precision.  Indirect bounds that assume the validity of, for example, the universality of free fall, the Weak Equivalence Principle or CPT symmetry also in the case of antimatter constrain an anomalous gravitational behavior to a level where only precision measurements can provide answers. Vice versa, antimatter experiments with sufficient precision are essential to validate these fundamental assumptions. AEgIS was originally proposed in 2007. Construction of the main apparatus was completed in 2012. Since 2014, two laser systems with tunable wavelengths (few picometer precision) and synchronized to the nanosecond for specific atomic excitation have been successfully commissioned.

AEgIS experimental setup and physics

AEgIS will attempt to determine if gravity affects antimatter in the same way it affects normal matter by testing its effect on an antihydrogen beam. The aspired experimental setup uses the Moiré deflectometer to measure the vertical displacement of a beam of cold antihydrogen atoms traveling in Earth’s gravitational field.  

In the first phase of the experiment (running until 2018), antiprotons from the Antiproton Decelerator (AD) with a kinetic energy of 5.3MeV had to pass through a series of aluminum foils which acted as so-called degraders, slowing down a fraction of the fast antiprotons to few keV. The slow antiprotons were then further cooled by merging them with extra cold trapped electrons (electron cooling) and finally trapped inside a Malmberg–Penning trap. An intense radioactive β+ source (22Na) was used to produce positrons, which were accumulated in a Surko-type storage trap at low pressure (3e-8 mbar). These positrons were implanted into a nano-structured porous silicon target in order to efficiently form positronium (Ps) - even at cryogenic temperatures in Ultra-high vacuum (UHV).  A cloud of positronium emerging from the target was then excited to a Rydberg level of n=16/17 by using laser-induced two-step optical transitions. Inside the Malmberg–Penning trap, the charge exchange reaction between cold antiprotons and Rydberg-Ps took place, leading to the formation of Rydberg-antihydrogen with high efficiency in the form of a 4π pulse.  

 (Charge exchange reaction)

In the second phase of the experiment, starting from 2021 after AEgIS has been successfully connected to the new antiproton deceleration and storage ring ELENA, the Rydberg antihydrogen atoms will be channeled into a beam, which then will pass through a series of matter gratings, the central piece of a Moiré-deflectometer. The antihydrogen atoms will ultimately hit onto the surface of a position and time-resolving detector, where they will annihilate.
Areas behind the gratings are shadowed, while those behind the slits are not. The annihilation locations reproduce a periodic pattern of light and shadowed areas. This pattern is highly sensitive to small vertical displacements of the anti-atoms during their horizontal flight - the Earth's gravitational force on antihydrogen can thus be determined.

AEgIS collaboration

The AEgIS collaboration comprises the following institutions:

See also 

 Antiproton Decelerator
 GBAR experiment
 ALPHA-g experiment

References

External links 

 Record for AEgIS experiment on INSPIRE-HEP
 AEgIS official home page

Particle experiments
CERN experiments
Antimatter